The 2022 European U23 Wrestling Championships was the 7th edition of the European U23 Wrestling Championships of combined events, and it took place from 7 to 13 March in Plovdiv, Bulgaria.

Competition schedule
All times are (UTC+2)

Medal table

Team ranking

Medal overview

Men's freestyle

Men's Greco-Roman

Women's freestyle

Participating nations

319 competitors from 34 nations participated
 (2)
 (17)
 (4)
 (21)
 (1)
 (26)
 (3)
 (1)
 (1)
 (6)
 (6)
 (3)
 (11)
 (1)
 (20)
 (19)
 (10)
 (23)
 (7)
 (11)
 (1)
 (4)
 (7)
 (20)
 (7)
 (2)
 (5)
 (18)
 (10)
 (6)
 (6)
 (4)
 (4)
 (30)

Results

Men's freestyle

Men's freestyle 57 kg
 Legend
 F — Won by fall

Men's freestyle 61 kg
 Legend
 F — Won by fall

Men's freestyle 65 kg
 Legend
 F — Won by fall

Men's freestyle 70 kg
 Legend
 F — Won by fall

Men's freestyle 74 kg
 Legend
 F — Won by fall

Men's freestyle 79 kg
 Legend
 F — Won by fall

Men's freestyle 86 kg
 Legend
 F — Won by fall

Men's freestyle 92 kg
 Legend
 F — Won by fall

Men's freestyle 97 kg
 Legend
 F — Won by fall

Men's freestyle 125 kg
 Legend
 F — Won by fall

Men's Greco-Roman

Men's Greco-Roman 55 kg
 Legend
 F — Won by fall

Men's Greco-Roman 60 kg
 Legend
 F — Won by fall

Men's Greco-Roman 63 kg
 Legend
 F — Won by fall

Men's Greco-Roman 67 kg
 Legend
 F — Won by fall
WO — Won by walkover

Men's Greco-Roman 72 kg
 Legend
 F — Won by fall

Top half

Bottom half

Men's Greco-Roman 77 kg
 Legend
 F — Won by fall

Men's Greco-Roman 82 kg
 Legend
 F — Won by fall

Men's Greco-Roman 87 kg
 Legend
 F — Won by fall

Men's Greco-Roman 97 kg
 Legend
 F — Won by fall

Men's Greco-Roman 130 kg
 Legend
 F — Won by fall

Women's freestyle

Women's freestyle 50 kg
 Legend
 F — Won by fall

Women's freestyle 53 kg
 Legend
 F — Won by fall

Women's freestyle 55 kg
 Legend
 F — Won by fall

Women's freestyle 57 kg
 Legend
 F — Won by fall

Women's freestyle 59 kg
 Legend
 F — Won by fall

Elimination groups

Group A

Group B

Knockout round

Women's freestyle 62 kg
 Legend
 F — Won by fall

Women's freestyle 65 kg
 Legend
 F — Won by fall

Women's freestyle 68 kg
 Legend
 F — Won by fall

Women's freestyle 72 kg
 Legend
 F — Won by fall

Women's freestyle 76 kg
 Legend
 F — Won by fall

References

External links 
 Database

Wrestling
European Wrestling U23 Championships
International wrestling competitions hosted by Bulgaria
European Wrestling Championships
European Wrestling Championships